Eudalaca infumata is a species of moth of the family Hepialidae. It is known from Zimbabwe and South Africa.

References

External links
Hepialidae genera

Moths described in 1942
Hepialidae
Moths of Africa